Iresh Chamara (born 4 March 1994) is a Sri Lankan cricketer. He made his first-class debut on 13 March 2020, for Sri Lanka Army Sports Club in the 2019–20 Premier League Tournament. He made his Twenty20 debut on 14 March 2021, for Nugegoda Sports and Welfare Club in the 2020–21 SLC Twenty20 Tournament.

References

External links
 

1994 births
Living people
Sri Lankan cricketers
Sri Lanka Army Sports Club cricketers
Place of birth missing (living people)
Nugegoda Sports and Welfare Club cricketers